Eldon Quick (born April 4, 1937, in San Joaquin County, California) is an American character actor. He is an alumnus of the American Shakespeare Festival and has numerous stage, screen, and television roles to his credit.

Quick's debut as a professional actor came at the American Shakespeare Festival in Stratford, Connecticut.

Quick's best-remembered television character is the bureaucratic Captain Sloan from two early episodes of M*A*S*H ("Payday" and "The Incubator"), which he reprised as Captain Pratt in "The Late Captain Pierce". Quick also played scheming magazine editor Rob Roy Fingerhead in an episode of The Monkees, and the villain Chronos in the final episode of Buck Rogers in the 25th Century.

He appeared in a Bewitched episode, "Samantha's Secret Saucer", as Captain Tugwell. Eldon Quick also appeared in the show Barnaby Jones; episode titled, "To Catch a Dead Man"(02/04/1973).

Quick's movie roles include Charlie Hawthorne in In the Heat of the Night, William Harper Littlejohn in Doc Savage: The Man of Bronze, and Reverend Lowell in The Big Bet.

Filmography

References

External links

Eldon Quick at Allmovie
Biography of Eldon Quick

1937 births
Living people
20th-century American male actors
Male actors from California
American male film actors
American male stage actors
American male television actors